John Alexander Roberts (2 January 1867 – 5 August 1921) was an Australian rules footballer who played with Carlton in the Victorian Football League (VFL).

Family
The son of William Roberts (1835-1924), and Jenefer Roberts (-1903), née Trahair, John Alexander Roberts was born at Scarsdale, near Ballarat, Victoria on 2 January 1867. 

He married Annie Beatrice Knoll (1873-1956) in 1893. They had four children,  Lillian Beatrice Laxton, née Roberts (1894-1980), 
Archibald John Roberts (1897-1967), Vivian Ernest Roberts (1902-1968), and Dorothy Emily Power, née Roberts (1899-). He was the father-in-law of Charlie Laxton, who married Lily in 1917.

Death
He died on 5 August 1921. He had "caught a chill" when attending the match between Collingwood and Essendon at Victoria Park on 30 July 1921. The "chill" developed into the double pneumonia from which he died.

An "In Memoriam" service was held at St Philips Church of England, in Collingwood, on 21 August 1921.

Notes

References

External links 

		

Jack Roberts's profile at Blueseum

1867 births
1921 deaths
Australian rules footballers from Victoria (Australia)
Carlton Football Club players